Rhys Vaughan was the member of Parliament for the constituency of Merioneth in 1545.

References 

Members of Parliament for Merioneth
Members of the Parliament of England (pre-1707) for constituencies in Wales
Year of birth missing
Year of death missing